Sidney Goldfarb (born November 23, 1942 in Peabody, Massachusetts) is a Harvard College-educated American poet and experimental playwright, whose work continues the tradition of poetic theater. Goldfarb co-founded the acclaimed Creative Writing Program at the University of Colorado at Boulder in 1975, serving as its first director. He continues to teach there today. He is the recipient of numerous grants and fellowships, including a Rockefeller Foundation Fellowship (1968), a National Endowment for the Arts grant (1970), a Goethe Foundation Grant (1984), and multiple grants from the New York State Council on the Arts.

Books 
Speech, for Instance (poetry), Farrar, Straus and Giroux, 1969
Messages (poetry), Farrar, Straus and Giroux, 1971
Curve in the Road (poetry), Halty-Ferguson, 1980
The Rushes of Tulsa and Other Plays (poetic theater), Barrytown-Station Hill, 2008

Plays 
(Dates indicate first production)

Pedro Páramo (adapted from the novel by Juan Rulfo), 1979
Huerfano, 1980
Tristan: A Retelling, 1983
Hot Lunch Apostles, 1983
The Transposed Heads (adapted with Julie Taymor from the novel by Thomas Mann, with music by Elliot Goldenthal), 1984
Big Mouth, 1985
Orange Grove, 1988
Music Rescue Service, 1991
The Rushes of Tulsa, 1999
Bad Women, 2000

Footnotes

External links 
 The Rushes of Tulsa and Other Plays page, Barrytown/Station Hill Press

University of Colorado faculty
1942 births
Harvard College alumni
American male poets
Living people
20th-century American Jews
21st-century American Jews